This article lists the characters appearing in Disney's The Lion King franchise.

Introduced in The Lion King (1994)

Simba

Simba (voiced by Matthew Broderick as adult Simba in the films, Jonathan Taylor Thomas as a cub in The Lion King, Matt Weinberg as a cub in The Lion King 1½, Cam Clarke in Timon & Pumbaa, Rob Lowe in The Lion Guard, Donald Glover in the 2019 film, JD McCrary as a cub in the 2019 film) is the protagonist of The Lion King franchise. He is the son of Mufasa and Sarabi, Scar's nephew, Nala's mate, and Kiara and Kion's father as well as Rani and Kovu's father-in-law. After defeating Scar, Simba takes Mufasa's place as King of Pride Rock before marrying Nala and having Kiara and Kion with her. His name means "lion" in Swahili.

In The Lion King II: Simba's Pride, Simba is an overprotective parent of Kiara and obtains a great hatred of the Outsiders, a group of lions led by a lioness named Zira, whom he exiled due to their loyalty to Scar, specifically Scar's protege Kovu, before learning to let go of his hate and accepting Kovu as his son-in-law.

In The Lion Guard, Simba fathers Kion, and initially refuses to accept Kion's decision to allow non-lion animals into the Lion Guard but later accepts his proposal. Currently in the show, after a failed attempt on Simba's life, orchestrated by the spirit of Scar, Simba, and Kion plot to defeat him once again and for all. As of season three, Scar's ghost has been defeated and his followers have become neutral under the rule of Jasiri, who becomes the new Outlands leader. However, due to a facial wound caused by a snake bite during the battle, Kion journeys to find the Tree of Life, to get healed. Simba bids his son farewell on his trip. He later welcomes Kion home following his journey and accepts his love to Rani of the Night Pride by accepting her as his daughter-in-law after Kion and Rani's marriage and after Kion's coronation as King of the Tree of Life.

Nala

Nala (voiced by Moira Kelly in the films, Niketa Calame as a cub in The Lion King, Gabrielle Union in The Lion Guard, Beyoncé in the 2019 film, and Shahadi Wright Joseph as a cub in the 2019 film) is the daughter of Sarafina, the best friend and later mate of Simba, and Kiara and Kion's mother. She is also Rani and Kovu’s mother-in-law by the end of the second film and the third season of The Lion Guard. Although she is a prominent character in The Lion King, she makes minor appearances in The Lion King II: Simba's Pride, The Lion King 1½, and The Lion Guard.

In The Lion King, she is portrayed as Simba's childhood friend (whom she is betrothed to when they were born and younger infants by their parents) After helping Simba enter the elephant graveyard, she has to be rescued by her future father-in-law, Mufasa when the hyenas attack them. Several years later, Nala encounters Simba as a young adult and develops a relationship with him. After returning to Pride Rock, she helps Simba defeat Scar and take his rightful place as King of Pride Rock afterwards she becomes Simba’s wife and mate as well as his Queen . In The Lion King II: Simba's Pride, Nala is depicted as slightly older, calmer, and less overprotective of Kiara than her mate, Simba. But she was the only one who has support her daughter’s relationship with Kovu by the end of the second film, she and Simba are presented at their daughter’s wedding and she accepts her son-in-law into her family as well as her new king of the Pride Lands. During the three seasons of The Lion Guard, she has a second cub; a male lion named Kion. By the end of the series, (like Simba) she accepts her son’s marriage to the Queen of the Tree of Life and leader of the Night Pride, Queen Rani while gaining her as her daughter-in-law.

Timon and Pumbaa

Timon (voiced by Nathan Lane in the films and the TV series Timon & Pumbaa, Quinton Flynn in earlier episodes of the TV series Timon & Pumbaaa, Kevin Schon in both later episodes of the TV series Timon & Pumbaa and The Lion Guard, Bruce Lanoil in the video games, Billy Eichner in the 2019 film) and Pumbaa (voiced by Ernie Sabella in the films, TV series Timon & Pumbaa, and The Lion Guard, Leslie Hedger in Disney's Extreme Skate Adventure, Seth Rogen in the 2019 film) are a meerkat and common warthog duo; Timon being a insouciant, yet trustworthy friend, while Pumbaa is greedy, yet courageous.

When they first meet Simba in The Lion King, they save an unconscious Simba from a flock of vultures. They take him in and bring him to their home in an oasis. Later, after Simba grows up and returns to the Pride Lands to battle Scar, they help Simba stop Scar's tyrannical reign and the two become Simba's royal advisors.

In The Lion King II: Simba's Pride, Timon and Pumbaa are assigned by Simba to keep watch over his daughter Kiara when she goes to play in The Pride Lands and later on her first hunt. They later aid Simba and his pride in the fight against Scar's vengeful follower Zira and her pride the Outsiders. After the Outsiders reform and rejoin Simba's pride, Timon and Pumbaa look on as Kiara marries Zira's son Kovu.

Although they are supporting characters in the first two films, they are featured as the main characters in The Lion King 1½ as well as in the TV series Timon & Pumbaa.

As revealed in the TV series The Lion Guard, they are the adoptive uncles of the honey badger Bunga and make their home at Hakuna Matata Falls.

In the 2019 film, Timon and Pumbaa had different animals as their neighbors in the oasis like a flock of guineafowl (one of them is voiced by Amy Sedaris), a galago (voiced by Chance the Rapper), an elephant shrew (voiced by Josh McCrary), a topi (voiced by Phil LaMarr) that has an awkward conversation with Simba, a bat-eared fox, an aardvark, a greater kudu, some dik-diks, and some Thomson's gazelles.

Scar

Scar (voiced by Jeremy Irons in The Lion King, Jim Cummings in The Lion King II: Simba's Pride and The Lion King: Simba's Mighty Adventure, James Horan in Kingdom Hearts II, Disney's Extreme Skate Adventure, and Sorcerers of the Magic Kingdom, David Oyelowo in The Lion Guard, Chiwetel Ejiofor in the 2019 film, Kelvin Harrison Jr. in the follow-up for the 2019 film) is the main antagonist of The Lion King franchise. He is a black-maned lion who is Mufasa's younger brother, Nala’s uncle-in-law, Simba's uncle, Sarabi's brother-in-law, Kiara and Kion's grand-uncle, and Kovu's adoptive father. His name is "kovu" in Swahili, similar to his adoptive son. In The Lion King, by murdering Mufasa and exiling Simba, he becomes "King of the Pride Lands". However, years later, Simba returns to Pride Rock and overthrows Scar to become King of the Pride Lands. Scar survives the fall but is attacked and killed by his hyena henchmen after they overheard him betraying them.

In The Lion King II: Simba's Pride, it is revealed that Scar had gained loyalty from a group of lions who were exiled from Pride Rock by Simba to The Outlands in the wake of Scar's death, with Scar's most loyal follower, Zira, being their leader. Scar is mentioned several times by the characters but makes two cameos. His first appearance is during Simba's nightmare, where he morphs into his adoptive son Kovu and throws Simba into the stampede that killed Mufasa, similarly to the first film. His second appearance is during Kovu's exile in which Kovu looks into his reflection and instead of his, he sees the image of his adoptive father. At the end of the film, Kovu marries Kiara, Simba and Nala’s  daughter, and Scar's great-niece, and becomes Simba and Nala’s son-in-law and successor.

The Lion Guard: Return of the Roar reveals that Scar was once the leader of the titular group and once possessed the Roar of the Elders. Scar lost the Roar after using it to destroy the other members of his Lion Guard (after they refused to help him overthrow Mufasa as king), as the Roar is meant to be used for good and not evil. In season two, Simba's son and the new leader of The Lion Guard Kion unknowingly summons Scar back as a fiery spirit in a volcano after using the Roar in anger when Janja the hyena provokes him. Scar then conspires with the animals in the Outlands to take over the Pride Lands and defeat the new Lion Guard and Simba, who were initially unaware that Scar had returned. Later in the season, Kion and the guard find out that Scar has returned, while they are in the Outlands getting volcanic ash needed to cure Simba of a scorpion sting. In season three's one-hour premiere Battle for the Pride Lands, Scar continues to battle the Lion Guard, who are now adolescents. It is also revealed that Scar got his scar after being bitten by a cobra as an adolescent while befriending a rogue lion from the Outlands. In anger, Scar used the Roar to kill the lion and snake, however, Mufasa teased his brother and gave him the nickname of Scar, leading to Scar plotting to dethrone Mufasa. At the end of Battle for the Pride Lands, Kion summons the Great Kings of the Past to rain upon Scar, thus destroying him once and for all.

In the 2019 film, Scar told Zazu to get help to rescue Simba while he goes to help him. This was a cover-up so that Scar can kill Mufasa. When Mufasa is dead and Simba has fled, Scar takes over as the ruler of the Pride Lands while allowing the hyenas to work with the lions. This led to overhunting. When Sarabi refuses to become Scar's mate, Scar makes things worse by having the hyenas eat first and they don't leave much behind. By the second advancement, Scar struck down Sarabi when she mentioned Mufasa. Like the films, Scar fought Simba and tried to blame Mufasa's death on the hyenas. When Scar is thrown off of Pride Rock, he survived the fall and was confronted by the hyenas. Scar states to them that if they build an army, they'll retake the Pride Lands. Azizi and Kamari state that they heard the insult towards them. Scar claims that he was trying to fool Simba and that there can still be a partnership between lions and hyenas. Shenzi states to Scar that he was right about a hyena's belly never being full. Scar strikes at some of the attacking hyenas until they swarm over him and kill him.

Mufasa
Mufasa (voiced by James Earl Jones in the films and the 2019 film, Gary Anthony Williams in The Lion Guard) is Scar's older brother, Sarabi's mate, Simba's father, Nala’s father-in-law, and Kion and Kiara’s paternal grandfather who is introduced as the King of the Pride Lands. The outstanding queen Uru of the pridelands alongside the brave King Ahadi are Mufasa's parents. His brother Scar's original name is Taka. Scar was a nice cub but became mean when he noticed Mufasa was going to be future king and King Ahadi spent extra time with him to teach him about ruling the lands. The name "Mufasa" has an unknown origin, previously attributed to a fictional language called Manazoto. Mufasa is depicted as a just, wise, and responsible leader, a gentle but firm father, and a strong and fierce protector when sufficiently provoked. In The Lion King, he teaches Simba what a king is supposed to be, and how the king is responsible for protecting and maintaining the delicate balance of the ecosystem, and mediate problems between its creatures. However, Mufasa later dies after being thrown into a wildebeest stampede by Scar while rescuing Simba. He returns years later as a spirit in the clouds to encourage an older Simba to return to the Pride Lands and reclaim his rightful throne.

In The Lion King II: Simba's Pride, he instructs Rafiki to bring Kiara, Simba's daughter, and Kovu, Scar's heir, together to reunite the two lion prides.

In The Lion Guard, Mufasa serves as a spirit guide to his grandson Kion when he needs advice, and sometimes appears on his own when he notices he is troubled by something. When Kion is a teenager, Kion fights against Scar's spirit and his army, winning, but gets bit by Ushari, who gave him a scar on his eye. As a result, during the journey to the Tree of Life, the adolescent lion stops communicating with his grandfather due to issues with his scar and personal concerns about turning evil like Scar, and Mufasa has become worried that he forgot about him, just like Simba did years ago when he became an adult. When they finally talk again, Mufasa reassures Kion that he would always be here for him no matter what, showing that regardless of his grandson's scar, he still loves him dearly. Alongside Askari and the previous queen of the Tree of Life, Janna, he proudly watches over Kion after his marriage to Rani by accepting her as his paternal granddaughter-in-law. Jones reprised his role in the pilot episode, but the character was voiced by Gary Anthony Williams in subsequent appearances.

Lion King Directors Roger Allers and Rob Minkoff have described Jones's voice as powerful and similar to the roar of a lion.

Jones reprises his role in the 2019 remake of the film directed by Jon Favreau. According to Favreau, Jones's lines remain mostly the same from the original film. Chiwetel Ejiofor, who plays Scar in the film, said that "the comfort of [Jones reprising his role] is going to be very rewarding in taking [the audience] on this journey again. It's a once-in-a-generation vocal quality".

In August 2021, it was announced that Aaron Pierre will voice young Mufasa in Barry Jenkins follow-up to the 2019 film called Mufasa: The Lion King.

Zazu
Zazu (voiced by Rowan Atkinson in The Lion King; Jim Piddock in Timon and Pumbaa's Jungle Games and The Lion King Simba's Mighty Adventure; Michael Gough in Timon & Pumbaa; Edward Hibbert in The Lion King II: Simba's Pride and The Lion King 1½; Jeff Bennett in The Lion Guard; John Oliver in the 2019 film) is a red-billed hornbill and majordomo to Mufasa and later Simba. After Mufasa's death, Zazu becomes a prisoner of Scar before Pumbaa breaks the bone cage, releasing him when Simba returns to the Pride Lands. He eventually acts as a scout and advises Simba on royal protocol.

In Timon & Pumbaa, it is revealed that Zazu is not only a lion king's majordomo; he is a jungle administrator. In the episode "Zazu's Off-By-One Day", he is shown to be responsible for counting the population of the animals.

In the musical, Zazu is a puppet controlled by an actor dressed in blue striped clothes and a bowler hat, much like a stereotypical butler. Zazu's blue feathers have been replaced with white and the puppet is partially constructed from parachute silk with a slinky contained in the neck for ease in movement.

Also appearing in the 2019 remake of The Lion King, Zazu plays the same role as in the original version, but this time, he is introduced to Timon and Pumbaa and helps out in the battle by pecking Kamari numerous times.

Rafiki
Rafiki (voiced by Robert Guillaume in most media prior to his death in 2017; Khary Payton in The Lion Guard; John Kani in the 2019 film & Mufasa: The Lion King), whose name means "friend" in Swahili, is a West African-accented mandrill with an unnaturally long tail. He lives in a baobab tree in the Pride Lands and performs shamanistic services for the lions of Pride Rock. He's also shown to be a great martial artist.

In The Lion King, Rafiki is introduced in the opening scene when he travels to Pride Rock to perform newborn Simba's presentation ceremony. During the film, Rafiki sings a nonsense chant: "Asante sana, squash banana, wewe nugu, mimi hapana." This is a Swahili playground rhyme that translates to "Thank you very much (squash banana), you're a baboon and I'm not!" Like "hakuna matata" (no worries), the chant was heard by the filmmakers on their research trip to Kenya. Rafiki travels to the jungle where Simba lives with Timon and Pumbaa and teaches him lessons about learning from the past: "Yes, the past can hurt but, the way I see it you can either run from it, or learn from it" and then whacks him with his stick. During the battle for Pride Rock, Rafiki saves Simba from Banzai by whacking him with his stick, while fighting many more hyenas. At the end of the film, Rafiki presents Simba and Nala's newborn cub.

In The Lion King II: Simba's Pride, Rafiki is more closely involved with the affairs and politics of the pride and is often seen with the lions. Mufasa's spirit persuades him to bring Simba's daughter Kiara and Zira's son Kovu together as a way of uniting the Outsiders with pride. Rafiki tries to make them fall in love by singing to them about a place called "Upendi", which means "love" in Swahili. In the end, he blesses the union of Kovu and Kiara, and Kovu is welcomed into the pride. Rafiki appears briefly in The Lion King 1½, teaching Timon the philosophy of "Hakuna Matata", talking to Timon's mother about her son, and later convincing Timon to follow Simba to Pride Rock to confront Scar.

In the musical, the character of Rafiki was significantly modified. Because director Julie Taymor felt that the story lacked a strong female character, Rafiki was changed into a female mandrill and sangoma. She acts as narrator throughout the story, at one point speaking to the audience in a click language for comic effect. She sings the opening song "Circle of Life", a keening song called "Rafiki Mourns" following Mufasa's death, and a brief part in Nala's song "Shadowland" when she blesses Nala for her journey to find help. Instead of detecting Simba's scent on dust, Rafiki hears Simba's song "Endless Night" on the wind. Rafiki finds Simba and shows him that his father lives on in him through the song "He Lives in You". She is present during the battle, fighting a hyena, and adorns Simba with the king's mantle after his victory; the play ends with her at the presentation of Simba and Nala's newborn cub.

Rafiki serves as a supporting character in the Timon and Pumbaa TV series, as well as the main character of said series as he has his own segments called "Rafiki Fables", where his shamanism is expanded. In the episode "Good Mousekeeping", it is revealed that Rafiki can grant wishes and can even take some of the wishes back. In another episode "Rafiki's Apprentice", Rafiki's stick is revealed to have magical powers. He explains to his nephew Nefu (voiced by Dana Hill) that the gourds on his stick are powerful for his magic.

Rafiki serves as a recurring character in The Lion Guard.

Rafiki is a meetable character at the Disney Parks and Resorts along with Timon, and can be found in Adventureland and at Disney’s Animal Kingdom.

Sarabi

Sarabi (voiced by Madge Sinclair in The Lion King as her penultimate theatrical film released posthumously, Alfre Woodard in the 2019 film) is Mufasa's wife, Simba's mother, Nala’s mother-in-law, Scar's sister-in-law and Kiara and Kion's paternal grandmother. Her name means "mirage" in Swahili. In The Lion King, she serves as the Queen of Pride Rock. Years after Scar usurps the throne, Sarabi helps Simba fight against Scar and his hyenas. When Simba defeats Scar, Nala becomes Queen and Sarabi becomes the Queen mother.

In the 2019 film following Mufasa's death, Scar tries to get Sarabi to be his mate. However, she turns down his advances.

Sarafina
Sarafina (voiced by Zoe Leader in The Lion King, Penny Johnson Jerald in the 2019 film) is a lioness who is Nala's mother, Simba's mother-in-law, Kiara and Kion's maternal grandmother, Rani and Kovu’s maternal grandmother-in-law and Sarabi's friend. She is first seen sleeping inside  Pride Rock with Nala and the rest of the pride. She later cleans Nala before the latter leaves to go to the Elephant Graveyard with Simba. She makes her final appearance mourning the loss of Mufasa and Simba, unaware that Simba is still alive.

In the 2019 film, Sarafina's role is still the same. When the hyenas arrived at Pride Rock following Mufasa's death, Sarafina told Nala to stay close to her.

Shenzi, Banzai, and Ed
Shenzi (voiced by Whoopi Goldberg in the animated films; Tress MacNeille in Timon & Pumbaa and Kingdom Hearts II; Jenifer Lewis in Sorcerers of the Magic Kingdom; Florence Kasumba in the 2019 film), Banzai (voiced by Cheech Marin in the animated films, Kingdom Hearts II, and Sorcerers of the Magic Kingdom; and Rob Paulsen in Timon & Pumbaa, and The Lion King: Simba’s Mighty Adventure) and Ed (voiced by Jim Cummings) are the three spotted hyenas who serve as Scar's lead henchwoman and henchmen and reside in the Elephant Graveyard. After Scar promises them and the rest of their fellow hyenas that they will have food in return for them helping him get rid of his brother Mufasa and nephew Simba to become King of the Pride Lands, the three hyenas trigger the wildebeest stampede which kills Mufasa and then chase Simba out of the Pride Lands on Scar's orders. When Simba returns to Pride Rock, Shenzi and Banzai are defeated by Pumbaa. The three turn on Scar when the latter tries to blame them for Mufasa's death and the ruin of the Pride Lands, and lead the rest of the hyenas into eating him alive during a wildfire.

Shenzi, Banzai, and Ed serve as main characters and antiheroes in Timon & Pumbaa. They are given their own segments titled "The Laughing Hyenas" where they wander around the Serengeti looking for food. At the end of the episode "TV Dinner", the hyenas replace television host Martin Pardon, which may indicate that they are living a new life as directors and stars of the wildlife documentary show Kingdom of the Creatures, where they get fed during their new career. In later seasons, they made minor appearances trying to attack Timon and Pumbaa.

In The Lion King II: Simba's Pride, it was only mentioned by Nuka that the hyenas have left the Elephant Graveyard. However, in the original draft of The Lion King II: Simba's Pride, Shenzi, Banzai, and Ed were going to return as Zira's henchmen, with Cheech Marin reprising his role as Banzai, Whoopi Goldberg returning as Shenzi, and Jim Cummings coming back as Ed from the original film.

In The Lion King 1½, Shenzi, Banzai, and Ed act as the local predators who attack Timon's meerkat colony before their allegiance with Scar.

Shenzi (voiced by Florence Kasumba) appears in the CGI remake complete with a different personality. She is portrayed as a ruthless and cunning matriarch with a no-nonsense attitude and air of authority. She is also shown to have a rivalry with Nala. Ed was replaced with Azizi (voiced by Eric André), and Banzai was replaced with Kamari (voiced by Keegan-Michael Key). Nevertheless, these two play largely similar roles to those of Ed and Banzai in the original film, except Azizi can speak. Azizi bugged Kamari by accidentally getting too close to him. As in the original film, Shenzi, Azizi, and Kamari hear the insult that Scar uses on them. When Scar is defeated and the hyena pack confronts him, Scar states that they can retake the Pride Lands if they build an army. Azizi and Kamari state that they heard the insult he used on them. Scar claims that he was trying to fool Simba and that there can still be a partnership between lions and hyenas. Shenzi quotes "There's only one true thing you ever said, Scar. A hyena's belly is never full." The hyenas' attack as Scar strikes at some of them before the hyenas swarm over Scar and kill him.

In the original draft of the film, the hyenas were African wild dogs, referred to as "Cape dogs" in the film. Their species may have been changed to illustrate the strong rivalry and competition between lions and hyenas in real life, where the competition is much stronger than between lions and other African savannah predators.

Introduced in Timon & Pumbaa (1995–1999)

Quint
Quint (voiced by Corey Burton) is a human who is Timon and Pumbaa's archenemy. He is a sneaky, muscular man with black hair, a pink nose, and a shaven face; he has varying roles. He wears different clothes in each episode because of the different jobs he has, but he is often seen wearing a hat. He also has different first names that show what his jobs are (in which they all happen to start with C).

Quint is a con artist who tricks Timon into stealing a gold nugget Pumbaa found in "Yukon Con", a criminal who stole a suitcase that has $1.29 million in "How to Beat High Costa Rica", an evil clock inspector who wants to get revenge on a timekeeper in "Swiss Missed", a French chef who wants to make Speedy the Snail escargot in "French Fried", etc. In "The Pain in Spain", two Quints are seen together which may prove that there is more than one of him.

In some episodes, Quint appears to be a respectable man with an honest job, but he still seems to annoy Timon and Pumbaa. Notably, in season 2, Quint's face appears to be clean-shaven except in "Klondike Con" when he becomes a gold thief. Also in "Escape from Newark", his nose is the same color as his body for the first time.

Speedy
Speedy (voiced by Corey Burton doing a Bing Crosby impression) is a talking grayish/bluish snail with a shiny red shell and a yellow fedora. Timon and Pumbaa plan to eat him at first, but his ability to speak and sing and his bon viveur, good-humored attitude get him to become friends with them. Timon gives him the name "Speedy" because he thinks that it would be a brilliant incongruity. Speedy always finds himself in danger, such as becoming a French gourmet snail and an earring out of his shell, and it's always up for Timon and Pumbaa to save him.

In "The Man from J.U.N.G.L.E.", Speedy is revealed to be a superhero called Super Duper Hero X after Timon and Pumbaa were captured by his nemesis, Chromosome Quint. Every episode featuring Speedy ends with Timon and Pumbaa saying bye to Speedy when they return him home, a seagull capturing Speedy, and then Timon and Pumbaa trying to save him once again. Speedy also makes a non-speaking cameo appearance in the episode "Washington Applesauce".

Fred
Fred (voiced by S. Scott Bullock) is a meerkat who is Timon's other best friend back at the meerkat colony. He is a practical joker, employing such gags as the hand buzzer, the squirting flower and the whoopee cushion. He also loved Timon's hyena jokes. When Fred visits, he pulls more practical jokes on the duo, such as impersonating Timon's mother or impersonating a Billy Goat guard. Timon and Pumbaa, however, don't find Fred's jokes very funny and they often overpower him. Aside from pulling practical jokes, Fred enjoys doing all sorts of activities, such as playing Turtle Tennis and Fishing for Flamingos. He also mentions that he and Timon have always gone Bowling for Buzzards.

At the meerkat colony, Fred's duty was to guard the Duke Meerkat's castle, although, on the day the Duke left the colony, he snuck away to get a snack and convinced Timon that it was now his chance to go on a date with Princess Tatiana. When the Duke banished Timon from the colony after a cobra kidnapped the princess, Fred's new duty was to guard the back gate, which indicates that he has been demoted for failing to protect the castle.

Fred appears in a total of four episodes: "Tanzania Zany", "Mombasa-In-Law", "Once Upon a Timon", and "Mind Over Matterhorn".

Boss Beaver
Boss Beaver (voiced by Brad Garrett) is an ill-tempered and cantankerous beaver with a white hard hat. His lifestyle is the exact opposite of Timon and Pumbaa's Hakuna Matata lifestyle: Boss Beaver likes to work while Timon and Pumbaa like to relax. He owns a lumber mill and an amusement park called "Boss Beaver's Log Land". Boss Beaver also has three mottos: "Makuta Hamaka", which means "work real hard", "safety first" and "you break it, you buy it."

Boss Beaver's favorite quote is "I am Boss Beaver and the reason they call me Boss Beaver is that I am your boss and I am a beaver. Therefore, I am Boss Beaver."

In "Amusement Bark", it is revealed that he has a mischievous son named Boy Beaver, who keeps breaking things at his amusement park and getting Timon blamed for it.

Boss Beaver appears in a total of three episodes, with a non-speaking cameo appearance in "Washington Applesauce".

Irwin
Irwin (voiced by Charlie Adler) is a clumsy, accident-prone penguin with a green scarf and a brown hat. Timon and Pumbaa befriend him at a boat stop in Antarctica when they see that he has two extra tickets for the duo to get on the ship. When Irwin leaves his home with the duo, it is shown that he has obviously injured all of his penguin "friends", as they are all seen wearing bandages. Timon dislikes Irwin's clumsiness and tries to get rid of him by tricking him into playing a game of Hide-and-Seek. Irwin accidentally causes the boat to sink and Timon and Pumbaa run into him on an island. Timon confronts the penguin and he tricks him into playing another game and Irwin accidentally causes the island to sink.

Irwin meets Timon and Pumbaa again at a Hakuna Matata Megamall. Due to his clumsiness, Timon and Pumbaa try to avoid him by hiding in various stores. Irwin appears in two episodes: "Frantic Atlantic" and "Shopping Mauled".

Toucan Dan
Toucan Dan (voiced by Jeff Bennett) is a dangerously clever criminal mastermind lying toucan who wears a red fez. He is a convincing liar and impersonator and would also do anything to get away with his crimes, including getting someone else in trouble. In his debut, "I Don't Bolivia", he keeps tricking Timon into freeing him from his cage. Later in the episode, while Timon impersonates Toucan Dan to not be in trouble with the police, Toucan Dan impersonates Timon and this makes Pumbaa have to decide which one is the real Timon.

Toucan Dan makes his second and final appearance in "Alcatraz Mataz", in which he frames Timon and Pumbaa for stealing a train car full of beak polish and the police throw them in jail. Angry, Timon and Pumbaa escape to catch the toucan and make him tell the truth.

Rabbit
Rabbit (voiced by Charlie Adler) is a large and tall pink hare who appears to be very annoying and tiring. He made his debut "Mojave Desserted". In that episode, Timon and Pumbaa save his life when he was drowning in quicksand and he decides to repay the duo hand and foot. Annoyed by Rabbit, Timon and Pumbaa hatch a plan to put themselves in danger and have Rabbit save them and then leave them alone.

Rabbit makes his second and final appearance in "Africa-Dabra!", this time appearing as an unsympathetic and ruthless magician. After Timon pulls him out of a hat, he teams up with the meerkat to become part of his magic act, telling him that he has been looking for a partner for years. When he gets annoyed by Pumbaa ruining the magic acts, he breaks up Timon and Pumbaa's friendship. When Pumbaa finds out that Timon never truly said anything mean about him, he gets revenge on Rabbit by trapping him in a cage and later skinning him for his disguise.

Vulture Police
The Vulture Police (voiced by Townsend Coleman and Brian Cummings) are recurring characters.

They make their first appearance in "The Law of the Jungle", where they arrest Timon for using the Forbidden Stick to scratch his back and take him to Judge Rhino, who gives several tests to see whether he's innocent or guilty.

In "Yosemite Remedy", Timon and Pumbaa go to the police after a criminal raccoon steals their suitcase full of valuables. When they handcuff the thief, he tells them that he didn't steal Timon and Pumbaa's suitcase, he found it. The police let him go, but later arrest him again when they find out that he really stole the duo's suitcase while catching him in the act.

In "Alcatraz Mataz", the Vulture Police throw Timon and Pumbaa in jail after they were convinced by Toucan Dan that they stole the train car full of beak polish. After Timon and Pumbaa confront Toucan Dan, the police show up and realize that it was really Toucan Dan who stole the train car, so they arrest the toucan. However, they also throw Timon and Pumbaa back in jail since they escaped when they told them not to no matter if they were framed or not.

The Vulture Police make a brief appearance in "Wide Awake in Wonderland".

Cheetata and Cheetato
Cheetata (voiced by Rob Paulsen) and Cheetato (voiced by Jim Cummings) are a pair of sophisticated twin cheetahs, reminiscent of Warner Bros' Goofy Gophers, speaking in British accents and using similar phrases ("Indubitably", "How very kind of you"). To tell them apart, not only do they have different voices, but they also have different personalities: Cheetata appears to be more eager and aggressive while Cheetato seems more likely to think things through.

The cheetahs first appear in "Cooked Goose", where they are annoyed by Shenzi, Banzai and Ed getting in the way of their wildebeest hunt, so they try sending them on various wild goose chases. They also appear in "Gabon with the Wind", where they are convinced by Timon that he is going to catch Pumbaa for them when he is actually going to find his friend so that they can both run away to safety.

In "Boary Glory Days", Timon and Pumbaa use Cheetata and Cheetato to play a game of Predator Tag. While the cheetahs are chasing Timon and Pumbaa, the duo outsmarts the brothers by having them jump over a mud pool and fall into it.

The Three Natives
The Three Natives (voiced by Jeff Bennett) are a trio of tribes who are really university students taking part in the "Be a Native" weekends. They have a leader (also voiced by Bennett), also a university student, who usually precedes what he says with "Bungala, bungala." The natives first appear in "Boara Boara". This episode shows that they used to have a warthog king of the island, which is unknown what might've happened to him. Therefore, the natives might have not seen their king in a really long time. When Timon and Pumbaa visit the island, the natives mistake Pumbaa for their long-lost king and they make Timon his servant. Everything goes well until they make Pumbaa relight the fire and realize that he's an impostor when they see that he is unable to do so. After Timon and Pumbaa escape, the three natives shed their disguises upon getting tired of being hit by the leader's staff and return to the university. The leader orders them to return or else they'll lose their deposit.

The natives also appear in "New Guinea Pig", where Pumbaa decides to trade his tusks to them. After they fail to get the tusks, the three natives shed their disguises and return to the university.

In "Beast of Eden", the three are shown with their leader again where they steal a golden magic tooth that belongs to a beast, and Timon and Pumbaa have to retrieve it from them.

They also make a brief appearance in "Mozam-Beaked" when Timon and Pumbaa go to Bora Bora to throw a woodpecker into the volcano.

Mr. Bear
Mr. Bear (voiced by Jim Cummings) is a grumpy, short-tempered, but nice grizzly bear, although he gets easily angered, such as when he is awoken from his nap or when someone gets his food order wrong. He also has a romantic interest in a beautiful supermodel named Leslie Lambeau (voiced by Grey DeLisle). He appears in seven episodes, from "Slalom Problem" to "It Runs Good". In "Jailhouse Shock", Mr. Bear becomes cellmates with Little Jimmy, who gets even with Timon and Pumbaa by taking advantage of him by convincing him that the duo hurt him so that he could beat them up. Mr. Bear starts to show compassion for Timon and Pumbaa in the episodes "Ready, Aim, Fire" and "Stay Away from my Honey!" In the former, he operated as Smolder the Bear (a parody of Smokey Bear) who dislikes fires and saves Timon and Pumbaa from being cooked on Quint's fire.

Tatiana
Tatiana (voiced by Tress MacNeille) is the daughter of Duke Meerkat and the princess of the meerkat colony. She only appears in one episode but she's vital for Timon's past. After Timon leaves his sentry duty post to prepare for his date with Tatiana, a king cobra enters the colony and kidnaps the princess, which makes everyone believe she's dead and causes Timon to get banished. After Timon and Pumbaa meet for the first time, they see that Tatiana is still alive and rescue her from a cobra. When Tatiana returns to the colony with Timon and Pumbaa, Timon is offered her hand in marriage. When the Duke makes him choose between Tatiana or Pumbaa, he chooses to be Bestest Best friends with Pumbaa as they leave the Meerkat colony. Although "Once Upon a Timon" was meant to be Tatiana's only appearance, there is a female meerkat who bears a striking resemblance to her in "Timon in Love". The only difference is that Tatiana has blond hair while the other meerkat has red hair, and she's not wearing a tiara.

Sharla
Sharla (voiced by Billy West) is a female warthog who is the leader of Pumbaa's former sounder as well as Pumbaa's ex-girlfriend. While she only appears in one episode, she is vital for Pumbaa's past. She and three other male warthogs of the sounder banished Pumbaa from the group due to his awful scent, which was appalling even by warthog standards.

Years later, Sharla and the three warthogs carry around a big bag of bugs for the rainy season but come across a flock of Guinea fowl, who are their natural enemies and nightmares. Due to the birds' abilities to remove their furs in just a few seconds, the warthogs refuge in a hut and make a distress call, which Pumbaa answers. When Pumbaa reunites with his sounder, he has Timon come up with ideas on how they can get rid of the Guinea fowl. However, none of Timon's ideas work, so Pumbaa suggests that he and Timon use the jeep so that they carry a fake bag of bugs (which have firecrackers inside) to distract the Guinea fowl while Sharla and the other warthogs leave the hut with the real bag of bugs.

Although Sharla banished Pumbaa from the group, they still have romantic feelings for each other. When Pumbaa arrives at the hut, they tell each other that they have never forgotten one another. Sharla tells Pumbaa that he should stay with the group, but Pumbaa decides to continue living his Hakuna Matata lifestyle with Timon, which the female warthog understands.

Ned
Ned (voiced by Frank Welker) is a high and mighty African bush elephant who thinks he's wonderful at everything. He seems to enjoy teasing Timon and Pumbaa when they fail at proving their worth to him. In "Uganda be an Elephant", Timon states that Ned is the most popular guy in the jungle and Pumbaa decides to turn himself into an elephant to be popular as well. Although Ned is selfish and sarcastic, he has a change of heart after Pumbaa rescues him and his hippo henchmen from falling off a cliff.

In "Unlucky in Lesotho", it is revealed that Ned has a Good Luck Club, which lost most of its members due to Ned bringing an unlucky jar into the club. Because he gets attacked by piranha upon falling into the river after a black panther cub crosses his path, Ned is never seen or heard from again after this episode, implying that he was devoured by the piranha.

Little Jimmy
Little Jimmy (voiced by Joe Alaskey) is a cute, yet extremely dangerous bluebird. Similar to Toucan Dan, in the fact that he is also a criminal mastermind. He also has two voices: one fake, cute and innocent to pass himself off as a hatchling and a deeper, criminal one to show that he is truly an adult. Little Jimmy first appears in "Nest Best Thing", where he tricks Pumbaa into building a birdhouse for him, which is actually a hideout. The pigeon police show up and arrest Little Jimmy.

In "Jailhouse Shock", Little Jimmy is cellmate with Mr. Bear. To get revenge on Timon and Pumbaa for turning him in, he tricks Mr. Bear into thinking that Timon and Pumbaa hurt him so that he could hurt them back.

Introduced in The Lion King II: Simba's Pride (1998)

Kiara
Kiara (voiced by Neve Campbell as a young adult; Michelle Horn as Kiara when she is a cub in The Lion King II: Simba's Pride; Eden Riegel in The Lion Guard) is the daughter of Simba and Nala, Kion's older sister, Mufasa, Sarabi and Sarafina’s granddaughter, Scar's great-niece,  Kovu's mate, Zira's daughter-in-law, and Nuka, Vitani and Rani's sister-in-law. She has a cameo appearance in The Lion King  She is the protagonist in The Lion King II: Simba's Pride and a recurring character The Lion Guard. As Simba’s first cub, Kiara is heir to the Pride Lands.

Kiara is portrayed as a feisty, playful, and adventurous princess, whose over-protective father Simba  fears for her safety. As a cub, Kiara befriends Kovu when playing at the Outlands where they work together to escape a group of crocodiles. Unfortunately, their friendship is cut short as they are separated by their respective parents. As a young adult, Kiara is rescued by Kovu as part of Zira's plan to avenge Scar's death, but the two lions eventually fall in love. When Kovu is exiled from the Pride Lands following Zira's ambush on Simba, Kiara defies orders to stay at Pride Rock, finds Kovu, and returns with him to the Pride Lands to reunite the Pridelanders and Outsiders. Kiara gives an impassioned plea for the two groups to unite. Vitani agrees with Kiara's reasoning and after Zira thoughtlessly betrays her as a result, the other Outlanders leave her side. Kiara then tries to reason with Zira, but to no avail, and eventually Zira found herself in danger and soon fell to her death after refusing Kiara's help.

In The Lion Guard, Kiara is seen being trained by her parents to be the next ruler and has a subtle sibling rivalry with Kion. Years later, she is engaged to Kovu where she assists him in explaining to Kion what happened while he was away and what happened to Zira.

Kovu
Kovu (voiced by Jason Marsden as a young adult, as well as both a cub and a young adult in The Lion Guard; Ryan O'Donohue as Kovu when he is a cub) is the youngest child of Zira, the brother of Nuka and Vitani, Scar's adoptive son and chosen heir, Kiara's mate, Simba and Nala's son-in-law. His name means "scar" in Swahili, similar to his adoptive father Scar. In his childhood, Kovu befriends Kiara, though this didn't last long as they are separated by their feuding parents. However, Kovu's newfound friendship with Kiara gives Zira the idea to use their friendship so that Kovu will have the opportunity to kill Simba. Since then, Zira trains Kovu to assassinate Simba and take his place as the king of Pride Rock. As a young adult, Kovu rescues Kiara during a planned ambush and Simba reluctantly allows him to stay in the Pride Lands. While spending time with Kiara, Kovu begins to fall in love with her and thus, unable to bring himself to hurt Simba. However, after Simba is ambushed by the Outsiders and Nuka is killed, Simba mistakenly assumes Kovu to be behind the ambush and exiles him from the Pride Lands. Eventually, after Kovu reunites with Kiara and convinces the Pridelanders and Outsiders to stop fighting each other, Simba pardons Kovu and welcomes him back to Pride Rock as Kiara’s mate and future king consort of the Pride Lands.

In The Lion Guard, Kovu appears with his family in their plot to take over Jasiri's territory. Kion learns from Kovu that Kiara knows him. Years later, Kion and the Lion Guard learn that Kovu and the rest of the Outsiders have rejoined Simba's pride following Zira's death. Simba names Kovu and Kiara as his successors.

Outsiders
The Outsiders are a pride of offshoot lions that were loyal to Scar. After a failed takeover following Scar's death, Simba exiled them to the Outlands. In The Lion Guard, they tried to invade the territory that Jasiri's clan lives in. Kion was hesitant to use the Roar of the Elders because of what it did to Scar. After being told by the rest of the Lion Guard that Scar used the Roar for evil, Kion defeated the Outsiders with the Roar of the Elders which sent them flying to the Outlands' termite mound area which became their base of operations. In the final episode of Season Three "Return to the Pridelands", it is revealed that after the Outsiders rejoined Simba's pride, four of them formed a new Lion Guard with Vitani to protect the Pridelands whilst Kion's Lion Guard's were travelling to The Tree of Life. At the end of the episode, Vitani's Lion Guard became the Pridelands' permanent Lion Guard after Kion's Lion Guard decided to step down and stay at The Tree of Life. One of the lionesses was voiced by Erica Luttrell in The Lion Guard episode, Lions of the Outlands.

Zira
Zira (voiced by Suzanne Pleshette in The Lion King II: Simba's Pride, Nika Futterman in The Lion Guard), meaning "hate" in Swahili, is the mother of Nuka, Kovu, and Vitani. She is Scar's most loyal follower, and plots to avenge Scar's death by forming the Outsiders. She takes advantage of Kovu's friendship with Simba's daughter Kiara, as part of her plan to assassinate Simba. When this plan failed due to Kovu's love for Kiara, Zira resorts to an all-out war against Simba's pride. However, because of Kiara and Kovu's actions, Vitani and the other Outsiders realize that they'd rather join Simba's pride and turn against Zira who persists in her revenge. Attempting to attack Simba, Zira is intercepted by Kiara and falls into a flash flood to her death, despite Kiara's attempt to rescue her.

Zira makes an appearance in The Lion Guard alongside Kovu, Nuka, Vitani, and the rest of her pride in the episode "Lions of the Outlands". She tries to convince Kion that using the Roar of the Elders against her and the other Outsiders would cause him to lose it just as Scar did, and to side with his fellow lions. However, Kion is eventually able to see through her deceptions and drives her and the others off with the Roar. Years later, her death was mentioned by Kiara and Kovu when the Lion Guard returned and met Vitani's incarnation of the Lion Guard.

Zira was originally slated to be Scar's longtime mate, and all three of her children were also his. However, there were concerns about incest in the final product, so Zira and Scar's exact relationship was made purposefully unclear and Kovu's relationship to Scar was expressly removed.

Nuka
Nuka (voiced by Andy Dick) is the eldest child of Zira and the older brother to Vitani and Kovu and is Kiara's brother-in-law. His name means "stink" in Swahili. Jealous of Zira's apparent favoritism for Kovu, Nuka often attempts to gain his mother's approval. During the Outsiders' ambush, Nuka attempts to kill Simba to prove himself to his mother but is crushed to death by the falling logs, though he finally gained the attention he longed for from his mother. Zira mourned her son's death and blamed Kovu for the incident. Early in the script, Nuka was the son of Scar, a large and cruel lion according to Kobler and his concepts. It is unclear if his relationship to Scar was also changed along with Zira and Kovu.

In The Lion Guard, Nuka assisted his mother in a plot to take over Jasiri's territory.

Vitani
Vitani (voiced by Meredith Scott Lynn as a young adult; Lacey Chabert as Vitani when she is a cub, as well as both a cub and a young adult in The Lion Guard; Crysta Macalush for her cub form's singing voice) is the middle child and only daughter of Zira and is Kiara's sister-in-law. Although she has a prominent appearance in The Lion King II: Simba's Pride, she makes a cameo appearance in The Lion Guard. As a young adult, Vitani is Zira's strongest lieutenant, supporting and acting on her mother's violent plans. With Kovu and Kiara's help, Vitani and the Outsiders turn on Zira and join the Pridelanders to settle the feud between the two prides peacefully. After Zira's death, Vitani and the other Outsiders are pardoned by Simba and rejoin his pride.

In The Lion Guard, Vitani assisted her mother in a plot to take over Jasiri's territory. Years later after she and her pride joined Simba's while Kion and his friends journeyed to the Tree of Life, Vitani formed her own Lion Guard in their absence where it was also mentioned what happened to Zira. As the future king's sister, she believes that it is her responsibility to protect the Pride Lands. She proves herself worthy to become the leader of the Lion Guard after she bravely challenges Kion despite not having the Roar of the Elders, thus revealing her heroic and honorable attributes thereby redeemed from her past villainy. Kion then bestows her the position and power of the leader of the Lion Guard. This allows Vitani to use the Roar of the Elders, and she and her Lion Guard are officially recognized as the new Lion Guard of the Pride Lands.

Her name is a Swahili portmanteau of the words "Vita" ("War"), "Ni" ("I Am"), and "Shetani" ("She-Demon"); the portmanteau can be roughly translated to "I Am War" or "Demon of War". "Shetani" itself was originally her name in early drafts of The Lion King II: Simba's Pride, but this was softened to "Vitani".

Introduced in The Lion King 1½ (2004)

Ma
Ma (voiced by Julie Kavner) is Timon's mother. Generally encouraging and optimistic, she believes in Timon and convinces Uncle Max to give him a job as a sentry or lookout. After Timon fails in his duty, she remains convinced that he can still find a place in the colony, but when he insists that he has to go, Ma supports him.

Later, she gets worried about Timon after speaking to Rafiki and searches for him. They finally reunite at Pride Rock and Ma helps in the battle against the hyenas by digging a long tunnel to trap them. After Simba becomes king with the death of Scar, Timon takes them and the entire meerkat colony to the jungle paradise which he and Pumbaa discovered. Ma is mentioned several times in Timon & Pumbaa and in The Lion Guard episode "Beware the Zimwi" by Timon, who claims that her cousin's friend knew an ox that was eaten by the Zimwi.

Uncle Max
Uncle Max (voiced by Jerry Stiller) is a prominent member of the meerkat colony and relative of Timon and Ma. He has a grey head-fur and a very large nose. Max is a pessimist by nature and very paranoid, believing that a meerkat's fate is to be "food for other animals! Feared by nothing and eaten by all!" Max reluctantly agrees to let Timon be a sentry for the colony and attempts to train him for the job, but is nearly eaten by the hyenas when they attack. He is glad to see Timon go but ends up going with Ma to find him. Max appears again towards the end of the film, where he and Ma encounter Timon and Pumbaa at Pride Rock and helps Timon get rid of the hyenas by digging a tunnel. Max finally believes in Timon, and after Timon takes the meerkats to his jungle paradise, Max teaches the meerkats tai chi.

Introduced in The Lion Guard (2015–2019)

The Lion Guard
They are the main characters in The Lion Guard:

Kion (voiced by Max Charles) is a lion who is Simba and Nala's son, Kiara's younger brother, Rani's mate, Mufasa, Sarabi's grandson, Scar's great-nephew and Baliyo and Kovu's brother-in-law. A short time after Kiara's first encounter with Kovu, Kion is born as the second-born child of Simba and Nala. In the show's one-hour pilot, "The Lion Guard: Return of the Roar", Simba has Kion organize the titular guard along with Bunga, Beshte, Fuli, and Ono. As the leader of the Lion Guard and second-born to the throne, Kion is gifted with a power called the Roar of the Elders which causes the great lion spirits of the Pride Lands past to roar with him. Kion is kindhearted and has a strong sense of responsibility, and does not want to end up like his great-uncle Scar, who used the Roar for evil and thus lost it forever. He also demonstrates a strong yet open sense of discernment, which warms him to scavengers like Jasiri the hyena, and her clan. However, more cunning neighbors such as Zira and Reirei have used his trusting spirit to exert their will, only to be soundly subdued when Kion's instincts come into play. Sometimes, when he has doubts, he communicates with the spirit of his wise grandfather Mufasa, who gives him advice when he needs his help. By the end of "The Rise of Scar", Kion travels to the Outlands to save Kiara after she is kidnapped by hyenas, and unknowingly summons Scar after he uses the Roar in anger when the lead hyena Janja threatens his family. Later in the season, Kion and the Lion Guard find out that Scar has returned while they are in the Outlands getting volcanic ash needed to cure Simba of a scorpion sting. Upon returning to the Pride Lands, Kion acknowledges to his team that they have a tough fight ahead, but remains confident that they will be able to defeat Scar. By the end of season three's one-hour premiere, "Battle for the Pride Lands", Kion manages to defeat Scar once and for all by summoning the Lions of the Past to destroy him with rain. However, in the process, Ushari, the venomous snake follower of Scar, attacks Kion, giving him a scar over his left eye. Kion and the Lion Guard then journey to find the Tree of Life to heal him. On the way to the tree, Kion often acts irritable and aggressive and loses control of his Roar due to the venom inside his body. He also stopped talking to Mufasa out of shame because he felt his scar makes him look like Scar. Once reaching the Tree of Life, Kion meets the protectors of the Tree of Life, the Night Pride, who guides him during his recovery process. While Kion is recovering, Kion becomes closer to and develops romantic feelings for Rani, the leader of the Night Pride, who later becomes the queen of the Tree of Life. Only after being encouraged by her, he finally decides to talk to his grandfather again and tells him that he was afraid of facing him due to his scar and his concerns about turning evil like Scar, but Mufasa is understanding, telling Kion that he could have talked to him anytime and reminds him that he would always be there for him. After he is healed from the poison, though the scar remains, Kion becomes unsure that he can lead the guard as he cannot control the Roar, but then realizes that he was already a great leader even without the Roar. This realization allows him to completely master the Roar under the guidance of the spirit of Askari, who led the first Lion Guard. Kion and his friends return to the Pride Lands after hearing from Jasiri that Zira and the Outsiders plan to attack his pride, but once arriving in the Pride Lands, finds that Zira has died and the two prides have merged. Zira's daughter Vitani has formed her own Lion Guard in their absence. Kion decides to pass on the role of the Lion Guard and the Roar of the Elders to Vitani and her lionesses, ending his and his friends' Lion Guard. Kion and his friends then return to the Tree of Life where Kion marries Rani, making him the king of the Tree of Life and its protector together with his friends, joining the Night Pride as well.
Bunga (voiced by Joshua Rush) is a honey badger who is Kion's childhood best friend and the bravest member of the Lion Guard. He is also Timon and Pumbaa's adoptive nephew and Simba's adoptive brother, thus also making him Kiara and Kion's adoptive uncle. Bunga is shown to be very adventurous and he rarely acts serious or even sits still, as he is always on the move, working off boundless energy and enthusiasm, and makes even the direst of situations into a fantastic time. Though this makes him a great friend and playmate, it lands him in trouble more often than not. According to Kiara, Bunga is "brave, bordering on stupid," but a valued member of the Lion Guard nonetheless. In the finale, Bunga joins the Night Pride and falls in love with a honey badger named Binga.
Fuli (voiced by Diamond White) is a King cheetah who is one of Kion's friends and the fastest member of the Lion Guard, as well as its first female member. She is quite prideful in her running abilities and shows extreme delight for being able to outpace a pursuer of any species. Despite being friends with Kion, she is somewhat resentful of the lions for lording over the Pride Lands, was skeptical about Kion's Roar of the Elders, and hates water. Despite these traits, she was willing to join the Lion Guard with her friends to defend the Circle of Life when Janja and his clan invaded the Pride Lands. She is also the first female animal to ever serve in the Guard as mentioned in the season 2 special The Rise of Scar. In season three, Fuli occasionally takes command of the Guard from Kion when his scar affects his rational thinking, serving as Kion's unofficial second-in-command. In the finale, Fuli joins the Night Pride and falls in love with a cheetah named Azaad.
Beshte (voiced by Dusan Brown) is a hippopotamus who is one of Kion's friends and the strongest member of the Lion Guard. Being one of the most popular animals of the Pridelands, Beshte is shown to be kindhearted. His friendliness extends to everyone, as he acts like a big brother to the younger members of his herd, a friend to animals of all different species, and a protector of the Pride Lands at large. Beshte can also, however, be sensitive, being especially tactful when his friend Kion is unable to use the Roar of the Elders. For an animal so large and full of life, Beshte has an appropriately large heart and never fails to treat his friends with kindness. In the finale, Beshte joins the Night Pride.
Ono (voiced by Atticus Shaffer) is a cattle egret who is one of Kion's friends and the keenest of sight of the Lion Guard, as well as its only non-mammal member before Anga joined. He is one of the more easygoing members of the group, being friendly and group-oriented. He is used to spending time around other animals and is content to be part of the Lion Guard. Ono is also shown to be blunt, as he can lay out his feelings without sugar-coating. He is by far the most realistic member of the group, as he always thinks things through before jumping in. When it comes to his role on the Lion Guard, Ono is brave and has a knack for following the rules. He obeys Kion's orders without question and proves himself to be plucky and thrifty, considerably useful when it comes to scouting out a situation. His principles are clear in his willingness to fight with his full heart for the Circle of Life, and he is a valued member of the Lion Guard for his intelligence and ability to see things from afar. During the final confrontation against Scar, Ono saved Bunga from falling into a volcano, consequently sucking too much smog that resulted in the near loss of his vision. He gave up his position as the keenest of sight to Anga, but remains a member of the Lion Guard after Kion bestowed him the new title of the smartest. He joins the guard to find the Tree of Life in hope of curing his eyes. After reaching the Tree of Life, Ono begins his healing process and finally regains his sight, though it is not as sharp as it used to be. In the finale, Ono joins the Night Pride.
Anga (voiced by Bryana Salaz) is a martial eagle who first appears in season two's final episode, where she teams up with Ono to stop Mzingo's committee from setting fire to the Pride Lands. She is a serious and no-nonsense bird, giving her the impression that she is cold and unfriendly. In reality, she is kind and caring, and her cold exterior is just her way of being calm. Like most birds, she admires Hadithi to the point she hardly able to contain her excitement whenever he is involved, making it one of the rare occasions Anga loses her composure. In season three, she becomes a member of the Lion Guard following Ono's injuries during the battle for the Pride Lands, taking up his position as the team's keenest of sight. In the finale, Anga joins the Night Pride.

Zuri and Tiifu
 Zuri (voiced by Madison Pettis) is a lioness cub and one of Kiara's friends. She appears to be vain about her appearance, as she constantly sharpens her claws on trees to keep them shiny. Unlike her friends, Zuri is delicate and timid. She shows considerable anxiety and fear in the face of simple circumstances and harbors deep disgust for grubs. She appears as a young adult at Kion's coronation in "Return To The Pride Lands".
 Tiifu (voiced by Sarah Hyland in season 1 and The Rise of Scar; Bailey Gambertoglio in season 2) is a lioness cub, and a friend of Kiara's. She is shown to be kind and patient, as seen when she comforts an overreacting Zuri. She is a great rule-follower and trusts the judgment of her friends, showing faith when she leaves Kiara to fetch help as Janja invades the Pride Lands. She appears as a young adult at Kion's coronation in "Return To The Pride Lands".

Askari
Askari (voiced by Michael Luwoye) is a lion and the leader of the original Lion Guard. His spirit teaches Kion about how the roar works during Kion's journey to the Tree of Life.

Night Pride
The Night Pride is a pride of Asiatic lions who protect the Tree of Life.

 Rani (speaking voice by Peyton Elizabeth Lee and singing voice by Lana McKissack) is the leader of the Night Pride and Kion's love interest. She initially mistook the Lion Guard as intruders after Bunga accidentally causes a landslide and Kion accidentally lost control of his Roar that blew away her younger brother Baliyo, but eventually welcomed them under her grandmother Janna's insistence. Although her trust with the Lion Guard was strained after learning that they have unknowingly been followed by Makucha, Chuluun, Ora, Mama Binturong, and their followers, she reconciled with Kion and the Guard after they have worked together to fight the predators off. Following her grandmother’s death, Rani becomes Queen of the Tree of Life, and at the end of the series, she marries Kion. Her name means "Queen" in Hindi. She and her Night Pride's catchphrase is "With strength and respect, Night Pride protect!"
 Baliyo (voiced by Hudson Yang) is Rani's younger brother, and later Kion's brother-in-law following Kion and Rani's wedding. His name means "Strong" in Nepali and "Powerful" and "Sacrifice" in Hindi (bali) and his catchphrase is "Lada'i!", which means "Fight" in Hindi.
 Surak (voiced by Lou Diamond Phillips) is Janna's son, and Rani and Baliyo's uncle. His name means "Clue" in Hindi and his catchphrase is "Jogina!"
 Nirmala (voiced by Miki Yamashita) is the Night Pride's healer. She is the one who guides Kion in his recovery process. Her name means "Pure" in Hindi and her catchphrase is "Aramakaro.", which, in Hindi, is a word split into three parts (araam, aa, and karo) that means "come have some rest". According to both Nirmala & Baliyo, "Aramakaro" also means "Relax".
 Janna (voiced by Shohreh Aghdashloo) is the former queen of the Night Pride and the Tree of Life, Surak's mother, and Rani and Baliyo's grandmother. In "Long Live the Queen", she died of old age. In "Return to the Pride Lands," her ghost is seen with the ghosts of Mufasa and Askari when Kion marries Rani with his Lion Guard agreeing to help the Night Pride protect the Tree of Life. Her name means "Paradise" in Arabic and "Life" in Hindi (jann).
 Sãhasí (voiced by James Sie) is Rani and Baliyo's deceased father. His ghost appears together with Ãnanda where he advises Rani to listen to Queen Janna's request to allow the Lion Guard into the Tree of Life. As a result of Kion and Rani's union, Sãhasí becomes Kion's father-in-law. His name means "Brave" in Hindi.
 Ãnanda (voiced by Grace Young) is Rani and Baliyo's deceased mother. Her ghost speaks to Rani together with Sãhasí where they advise Rani to listen to Queen Janna's request to allow the Lion Guard into the Tree of Life. As a result of Kion and Rani's eventual union, Ãnanda becomes Kion's mother-in-law. Her name means "Joy" in Hindi.

Makini
Makini (voiced by Landry Bender) is a young mandrill who is Rafiki's new apprentice. She is free-spirited and loves to learn and look up to her mentor. However, she has trouble being calm and she is easy to deceive, which was the cause of Scar's resurrection. Despite this, Makini takes pride in herself and her position, and is friendly and welcoming to everyone she meets. She joins the Lion Guard on their journey to the Tree of Life, though she unintentionally reveals the Tree of Life's existence to Makucha. Following Queen Janna's passing, Makini is made Rani's Royal Mjuzi.

Vitani's Lion Guard
Vitani's Lion Guard is a group of lionesses who take the role of the Lion Guard during Kion and his Lion Guard's absence, due to their journey to the Tree of Life. Led by Kovu's sister Vitani who is the fiercest member of her guard, her Lion Guard is the first Lion Guard to be led by a female lion, have all female members and be led by the elder sibling instead of the younger (due to Kovu being the future king, despite being younger than Vitani, though Vitani is still a second-born child). Once Kion and his Lion Guard returned, they and Vitani mistaken each other for enemies (with the former having received warning that Zira's pride is attacking the Pride Lands, unaware that the war was already over). However, after Kiara and Kovu stopped the fight, Kion and his allies are told what has happened, and Vitani realizes that it was Kion she was fighting, not recognizing him due to his scar. Although the initial battle was resolved, Vitani's guard and Kion's guard share a rivalry at first but eventually become friends as time progressed.

Besides Vitani, the rest of her Lion Guard consists of:

 Shabaha (voiced by Fiona Riley) is the bravest member of Vitani's Lion Guard, known for her level of insanity. Janja comments that her fighting style is similar to Bunga, much to his liking, but whereas Bunga's bravery leaves him dimwitted, Shabaha's makes her slightly unhinged: she often laughs maniacally in the midst of a challenge. Her catchphrase is "Bila hofu!", which is Swahili for "Without fear!"
 Kasi (voiced by Savannah Smith) is the fastest member of Vitani's Lion Guard, noted to have Fuli's level of serenity. Though without the advantage of Fuli's cheetah speed, Kasi has more constant stamina, as she is a lion, and agility, in part due to her thin build. Her catchphrase is "Haraka, haraka!", which is Swahili for "Hurry, hurry!"
 Imara (voiced by Rachel Crow) is the strongest member of Vitani's Lion Guard, given her tenacity. With a stocky build, she proves nearly as strong as Beshte, as seen when she can slightly push back Beshte during their first encounter and when they are competing by pushing elephant-topped rocks. Her catchphrase is "Misuli!", which is Swahili for "Muscles!"
 Tazama (voiced by Sophie Reynolds) is the keenest of sight in Vitani's Lion Guard, as well as a supportive team player. While not able to fly like Anga or Ono, Tazama is capable of seeing in darkness, something Anga and Ono cannot do,  and has some level of Ono's tact, using his rules in the challenges against Anga. Her catchphrase is "Hiyo kali!", which is Swahili for "That's terrific!"

Aardvarks
The following aardvarks appear in The Lion Guard:

 Muhangus (voiced by Khary Payton) is an aardvark and the leader of his shoal.
 Muhanga (voiced by Russi Taylor) is an aardvark who is Muhangus's mate.

Aardwolves
The following aardwolves appear in The Lion Guard:

 Mjomba (voiced by Charlie Adler) is a grumpy and impatient aardwolf who is the leader of the pack. He has a hunched back, bushy black eyebrows, gray fur, and darker gray markings. His inner ears are pink, and his nose is black. Like the rest of the pack, he adores termites. His name in Swahili means "uncle."
 Ogopa (voiced by Marieve Herington) is a bright and cheerful aardwolf. She has blue-gray fur and black markings, as well as a narrow muzzle and a black nose. Her yellow eyes are large and framed by a few eyelashes, and her inner ears are pink with a couple of hairs sprouting from each. Like the rest of the pack, she adores termites. She is easily frightened and tends to jump to conclusions. She also tends to add afterthoughts after she states her opinion on a subject.
 Haya (voiced by Ogie Banks) is a nervous and shy aardwolf. He has dark gray fur with longer fur on his cheeks and black markings, and his inner ears are pink with a few hairs sprouting from them. His upper teeth protrude from his dark muzzle. Like the rest of the pack, he adores termites. Like Ogopa, he tends to add afterthoughts after stating his opinion.

Arabian tahr
A group of Arabian tahr reside at the Tree of Life:

 Cek (voiced by Jeremy Ray Valdez) is the leader of his herd.
 Rama (voiced by Tiffany Espensen) is married to Cek.

Baboons
The following baboons, whether they be olive baboons or yellow baboons, appear in The Lion Guard:

 Big Baboon (voiced by Ford Riley in Return of the Roar, Dee Bradley Baker in later appearances) is an olive baboon and leader of his troop.
 Gumba (voiced by Jacquez Swanigan) is a young olive baboon who is part of Big Baboon's troop.
 Uroho (voiced by David Adkins) is a sneaky yellow baboon who is the leader of the Traveling Baboon Show.
 Mwevi and Mwizi (both voiced by Dee Bradley Baker) are a duo of yellow baboons who are part of Uroho's Traveling Baboon show.

Bears
The following bears, whether they be giant pandas or polar bears, appear in The Lion Guard:

 Heng Heng (voiced by Tiffany Espensen) is a giant panda who lives at the Tree of Life.
 Tangaagim (voiced by Rafael Petardi) is a polar bear who lives at the Tree of Life and is the leader of his sleuth.

Mama Binturong
Mama Binturong (voiced by Rachel House) is a sneaky and arrogant binturong crime boss who lives in a stone forest and enjoys eating tuliza until Bunga ruins her tuliza pile with his stink, causing Mama Binturong to chase him down with intention on finishing him. In "The River of Patience", after Makucha, Chuluun, and Ora were defeated by the Lion Guard and the Night Pride, Mama Binturong joins them to assist them in their cause.

Vuruga Vuruga
Vuruga Vuruga (voiced by Virginia Watson) a Cape buffalo who is the leader of her herd. Kiara once presided over their Royal Buffalo Wallow.

Kinyonga
Kinyonga (voiced by Meghan Strange) is a veiled chameleon who once helped the Lion Guard by spying on Scar in the Outlands.

Cheetahs
Besides Fuli, the following cheetah appears in The Lion Guard:

 Azaad (voiced by Behzad Dabu) is a prideful King cheetah that the Lion Guard encounter in his canyon during their journey to the Tree of Life. He later helped them to the Tree of Life where he visited before and guided them down the fastest route to the Pride Lands where he later meets Simba and Nala. He is also Fuli's love interest.

Civets
There are some civets that appear in The Lion Guard:

 Old Civet (voiced by Matthew Yang King) is an unnamed elderly large Indian civet that the Lion Guard encountered near Dragon Island during their journey to the Tree of Life.
 Tompok (voiced by Johnny Yong Bosch) is a banded palm civet that the Lion Guard encounter in a forest during their journey to the Tree of Life.

Yun Mibu
Yun Mibu (voiced by Jason Lashea) is a clouded leopard that the Lion Guard encounter in a forest during their journey to the Tree of Life.

Crocodiles
The following crocodiles appear in The Lion Guard:

 Pua (voiced by Gerald C. Rivers) is an elderly Nile crocodile who originally led the crocodile float, until he is defeated by Makuu in a "mashindano" battle for the position of alpha male. Upon defeat, Pua leaves the float.
 Makuu (voiced by Blair Underwood) is a young, sleek, and well-built Nile crocodile who leads the crocodile float that lives in the Pride Lands after defeating the previous leader Pua in battle. He is shown to be boastful and loves to bask in the attention of others. Unlike his predecessor, Makuu initially has no respect for tradition or the Circle of Life, and certainly not for authority (except his own), seeing both Pua and Kion as weak and cowardly. He appears to only respond to strength and power, as he was awestruck by the Roar of the Elders and gave into Kion's second demand to leave Big Springs while trying to save face. In season two, Makuu has decided to become a better leader for his float, reforming from his trouble-making ways.
 Kiburi (voiced by Common) is a former member of Makuu's float. Much like a less experienced Makuu, he saw no reason why the crocodiles should have regard for the other animals of the Pride Lands. After the crocodiles were accidentally awakened from dry season aestivation by the Lion Guard, Kiburi led most of the float to seize bodies of water. He later challenged Makuu to a mashindano, having made an alliance with Ushari and a plan to eliminate Simba. Upon being defeated, he and his three supporters were expelled from the Pride Lands and became a part of Scar's growing collective in the Outlands. In some later episodes of season two and the season three opener, more crocodiles have been known to be part of Kiburi's float in the Outlands. Following Scar's defeat, Kiburi reluctantly accepted Jasiri as the leader of the Outlands.
Tamka (voiced by Nolan North) is a brutish, yet unintelligent crocodile loyal to Kiburi.
 Nduli (voiced by Jorge Diaz) is an optimistic crocodile loyal to Kiburi.

Lumba-Lumba
Lumba-Lumba (speaking voice by Tania Gunadi and singing voice by Kimiko Glenn) is a pink Indo-Pacific humpback dolphin that the Lion Guard encounter near a Dragon Island during their journey to the Tree of Life.

Eagles
Besides Anga, the following eagle appears in The Lion Guard:

 Hadithi (voiced by John O'Hurley) is a legendary African hawk-eagle who faked having invented the Hadithi Spin.

Elephants
The following elephants appear in The Lion Guard:

 Ma Tembo (voiced by Lynette Dupree) is an adult African bush elephant with a broken right tusk, who attains leadership of her father Aminifu's herd after his death. Much like her father, she is always game for a laugh. Even when Simba makes a mistake at her father's funeral, she is gracious and kind and makes light of the situation by dwelling on the good. She is similarly gracious to Nala and Kiara when they are the only members of their family to attend the elephant concert. Ma Tembo's herd resided in Kilio Valley until it was destroyed by a fire caused by the Outlanders in "The Kilio Valley Fire".
  Mtoto (voiced by Natalie Coughlin in "Bunga the Wise," Justin Felbinger in later episodes) is an elephant calf who idolizes Beshte. He appears to be innocent with little understanding of the world. His playful nature often gets him into trouble, though his intentions are usually good.
 Mtoto's Mom (voiced by Russi Taylor in "Follow That Hippo!," Virginia Watson in later episodes) is an unnamed African bush elephant who is part of Ma Tembo's herd.
 Zito (voiced by Nick Watt) is a grouchy and impatient African bush elephant who is part of Ma Tembo's herd.
 Johari (voiced by Ace Gibson) is an African bush elephant who is part of Ma Tembo's herd.
 Zigo (voiced by Marieve Herington) is an African bush elephant who is part of Ma Tembo's herd.
 Chama (voiced by Jacob Bertrand) is a young fun-loving African bush elephant who used to be part of Ma Tembo's herd. He, Mzaha, and Furaha are best friends and share a tree near Big Springs.

Astuto
Astuto (voiced by Meghan Strange) is a Darwin's fox who lives at the Tree of Life and the mother of her unnamed kits.

Flamingos
The following flamingos appear in The Lion Guard:

 Flamingo Girls (voiced by Anndi McAfee and Sarah Grace Wright) are two unnamed flamingos that the Lion Guard encounter on their beach during their journey to the Tree of Life.

Flying squirrels
Kion and the Lion Guard encountered a scurry of flying squirrels in the mountains during their journey to the Tree of Life. Yuki's snow monkey troop mistook them for birds and were afraid until the Lion Guard cleared things up.

 Tafu (voiced by Christopher Willis) is the leader of his flying squirrel scurry.

Galagos
Laini (voiced by Meghan Strange) is a galago who is the leader of her group in Ndefu Grove.

Gazelles
The following gazelles appear in The Lion Guard:

 Swala (voiced by Tunisia Hardison) is a Thomson gazelle who is the leader of her herd.

Hodari
Hodari (voiced by Justin Hires) is an electric blue gecko who dreamed of being in a crocodile float. Makuu made him an honorary member of his float due to his bravery when confronting Kiburi.

Seisou
Seisou (voiced by Greg Chun) is a Northern white-cheeked gibbon that the Lion Guard encounter in a forest during their journey to the Tree of Life.

Giraffes
The following giraffes appear in The Lion Guard:

  Twiga (voiced by Alex Cartana) is a Masai giraffe who is the leader of the herd.
 Juhudi (voiced by Ivy Bishop) is a young Masai giraffe calf who is Twiga's daughter.
 Shingo (voiced by Phil LaMarr) is a Masai giraffe who is part of Twiga's herd.

Gorillas
The following gorillas appear in The Lion Guard:

 King Sokwe (voiced by John Rhys-Davies) is an adult eastern lowland gorilla who is the king of the Theluji Mountains and leader of his troop. His name in Swahili means 'Ape' and is an ally to Simba. King Sokwe is also a father to two dimwitted princes Majinuni and Hafifu.
 Majinuni (voiced by Dan Howell) is a juvenile eastern lowland gorilla prince and brother of Hafifu who came to the Pride Lands to deliver a message to Simba. His name in Swahili means 'buffoon'. His catchphrase is "Kusihi Ni Kucheka", which means "To live is to laugh".
 Hafifu (voiced by Phil Lester) is a juvenile eastern lowland gorilla prince and brother of Majinuni who came to the Pride Lands to deliver a message to Simba. In Swahili, his name means ‘poor, weak and silly talk’. His catchphrase is "Kuishi Ni Kucheka", which means "To live is to laugh".
 Shujaa (voiced by Christopher Jackson) is a large adolescent mountain gorilla warrior from the Bwindi Impenetrable Forest who was sent to the Pride Lands by King Sokwe of the Theluji Mountains to help Kion, Fuli, Ono, Bunga and Beshte to fight and defeat the army of Scar. His name in Swahili means "The Hero" or "Warrior". His catchphrase is "Shujaa Ponda", which means "Hero Crush". He first appeared in "Beshte and the Beast". He has colored blueish-grey and canine teeth. After defeating the villainous outlanders, Shujaa also helped put out a wildfire and carried Beshte to safety.

Hawks
The following hawk appears in The Lion Guard:

 Mpishi (voiced by Carla Hall) is an African harrier-hawk who leaves her hunting grounds from an unknown land and travels to the Pride Lands looking for a rare meal. She teamed up with Mwoga to target Kulinda's newly hatched chick only to be driven off by the Lion Guard.

Masiko
Masikio (voiced by Dee Bradley Baker) is a Natal red rock hare whose group and sister the Lion Guard saved from mudslides.

Hippopotamuses
Besides Beshte, the following hippos appear in The Lion Guard:

 Basi (voiced by Kevin Michael Richardson) is a hippopotamus who is Beshte's father and leader of his and his son's pod. He is amicable and open, willing to engage in conversation and negotiate according to the customs of the Pride Lands. Even in the face of adversity, such as Makuu's violent takeover of Big Springs, Basi maintains his temper and graciously offers the crocodile a chance to return once the fish have returned in plenty. Being so learned in the ways of the animals, Basi is knowledgeable and wise. Despite being an animal with a very different way of life, he understands the customs of the crocodiles and how this affects his pod's everyday life. Unlike the inexperienced young Makuu, Basi grasps an understanding of the Circle of Life and how every animal must give and take to keep it in balance.
 Bellow Fellows (voiced by Ace Gibson, Khary Payton, and Kevin Schon) are a group of hippos.
 Kiazi is a hippopotamus calf.

Honey Badgers
Besides Bunga, the following honey badger appears in The Lion Guard:

 Binga (voiced by Fiona Riley) is a honey badger who lives at the Tree of Life and befriends Bunga.

Hyenas
The following hyenas appear in The Lion Guard:

 Janja (voiced by Andrew Kishino) is the cunning and aggressive leader of the hyenas in the Outlands, descended from the hyenas from the original film and one of the main antagonists. In "The Hyena Resistance", Jasiri saves Janja from falling into a steam vent and tells him that he and his clan are welcome to join her clan's hyena resistance to defeat Scar. After some hesitation, Janja dismisses her offer, but his hesitation causes Ushari's skinks to question his loyalty and leaves Jasiri hopeful that he will come around eventually. In season three's one-hour premiere, "Battle for the Pride Lands", Janja reforms, and after Scar's destruction and Ushari's death, Janja nominates Jasiri to be in charge of the Outlands, foreshadowing some peace, as well as unifying both clans.
 Cheezi (voiced by Vargus Mason) is one of Janja's right-hand henchmen. He is an excitable hyena who is usually seen sticking his tongue out. Cheezi’s character looks similar to Ed.
 Chungu (voiced by Kevin Schon) is one of Janja's right-hand henchmen. He is an unintelligent hyena who has a tough attitude and a slightly heavier build than the other hyenas.
 Nne (voiced by Beau Black) is a stout but sly and smart hyena. Janja appointed him and Tano to become Cheezi and Chungu's replacement when Janja blamed them for the failure in their plan. However, Nne and Tano eventually ditched Janja as they're proven to be smarter than him and deemed their leader to be too stupid to carry out their plan, which was later foiled by the Lion Guard.
 Tano (voiced by Dee Bradley Baker) is a sloping, but devious, and smart hyena. Janja appointed him and Nne to become Cheezi and Chungu's replacement when Janja blamed them for the failure in their plan. However, he and Nne eventually ditched Janja as they're proven to be smarter than him and deemed their leader to be too stupid to carry out their plan, which was later foiled by the Lion Guard.
 Jasiri (voiced by Maia Mitchell) is a friendly female spotted hyena who makes her first appearance "Never Judge a Hyena By Its Spots." Unlike most of her species, she is open to making friends with lions. Bold and spunky, Jasiri can look past differences and focus on where different species have common ground. Unlike Janja and his clan, she dislikes selfishness and gluttony, and she respects the Circle of Life. In "The Hyena Resistance", when Jasiri learns from Kion that Scar has returned, she and her clan form a resistance to aid the Lion Guard and help defeat Scar. In season three, Jasiri accepts Janja and his clan as members of her clan, and after Scar’s defeat and destruction, Jasiri becomes the leader of the Outlands.
 Madoa (voiced by Maisie Klompus) is a spotted hyena who is Jasiri's sister and is part of her clan.
 Tunu (voiced by Crimson Hart) is a spotted hyena cub and brother of Wema who is part of Jasiri's clan.
 Wema (voiced by Fiona Hart) is a spotted hyena cub and sister of Tunu who is part of Jasiri's clan.

Jackals
The following characters as jackals appear in The Lion Guard:

 Reirei (voiced by Ana Gasteyer) is a clever, scheming, and manipulative jackal who is the matriarch of her family pack.
 Goigoi (voiced by Phil LaMarr) is Reirei's mate who only thinks with his stomach and has the tendency to fall asleep.
 Dogo (voiced by Jacob Guenther) is one of Reirei and Goigoi's sons who uses his innocent looks to his advantage to win the trust of others to take advantage of them.
 Dogo's Siblings (voiced by Jacob Guenther and Dee Bradley Baker) are Reirei and Goigoi's sons and Dogo’s brothers.
  Kijana (voiced by Amber Hood) is Reirei and Goigoi's daughter.

Tupp
Tupp (voiced by Amir Talai) is a jerboa that the Lion Guard meet in the desert during their journey to the Tree of Life.

Kely
Kely (voiced by David S. Jung) is a golden bamboo lemur who lives at the Tree of Life and is the leader of his troop.

Leopards
Several leopards, appear in The Lion Guard. Four are antagonists while one is befriended by the Lion Guard:

 Makucha (voiced by Steve Blum) is a cunning, powerful cream-colored male leopard who comes to the Pridelands in pursuit of the okapi Ajabu, and who proves to be quite an adversary to the Lion Guard due to his speed and strength. Makucha is later revealed to be the leader of his leap which is first shown when the Lion Guard was looking for water in the Back Lands during a water shortage in the Pride Lands. Makucha becomes the main antagonist of season three, starting with "The Harmattan". After hearing from Makini excitedly talking all about the Tree of Life and the rare animals, Makucha uses that info to make a new goal: sneakily follow the Lion Guard to the Tree of Life, so that he can feast on the rare animals. He gained allies along the way. When he does arrive at the Tree of Life, Makucha and his allies are eventually blown away by the Roar of the Elders.
Fahari (voiced by Nolan North) is a cream-colored leopard and a member of Makucha's leap.
 Jiona (voiced by Ace Gibson) is a cream-colored leopard and a member of Makucha's leap.
 Mapigano (voiced by Jorge Diaz) is a cream-colored leopard who attempts to take over Badili's territory until Badili gains confidence through training with the Lion Guard and drives him out.
 Badili (voiced by Jack McBrayer) is a friendly cream-colored leopard from Mirihi Forest in the Back Lands who was driven out of his territory by Mapigano. The Lion Guard trained him to have enough courage to drive off.

Mandrills
Besides Rafiki and Makini, there are other mandrills that appear in The Lion Guard:

 Kitendo (voiced by Christopher Jackson) is the father of Makini and the leader of his troop.
 Fikiri (voiced by Heather Headley) is the mother of Makini and the wife of Kitendo.

Kuchimba
 Kuchimba (voiced by AJ McLean) is a golden mole who lives underground. He helped Kion, Bunga, Kiara, Tiifu, and Zuri find part of their way back to Pride Rock when they were lost underground, and taught Tiifu that the dark is nothing to be afraid of.

Mongooses
There are some mongooses that live in the Pride Lands. Kion later encountered a group of mongooses in a marsh during their journey to the Tree of Life.

 Shauku (voiced by Jacob Guenther) is a young banded mongoose pup.
 Pãgala (voiced by Eric Bauza) is a mongoose that is the leader of a mob of mongooses that live in a marsh. He dislikes it when anyone other than his mob eats the local snails.
 Krud'dha (voiced by Nolan North) is a member of Pãgala's mob.
 Bambun (voiced by Matthew Yang King) is a mongoose that the Lion Guard encounter in a forest during their journey to the Tree of Life.

Monitor lizards
Several monitor lizards appear in The Lion Guard, either rock monitors or Komodo dragons:

 Kenge (voiced by Kristofer Hivju) is an enormous and ferocious rock monitor, an acquaintance of Ushari who dislikes being called "little" or else it will infuriate him. His bite—venomous to everyone except Bunga—induces temporary paralysis.
 Ora (voiced by Andrew Kishino) is a ferocious Komodo dragon and the leader of his bank who joins Makucha to follow the Lion Guard to the Tree of Life.

Okapis
Several okapis who appear in The Lion Guard include:

 Ajabu (voiced by Ron Funches) is an okapi who came to the Pride Lands to get away from Makucha and made friends with Beshte. He is at first mistaken as Beshte's imaginary friend by Ono and Bunga due to his constant disappearance. After the Lion Guard drove away Makucha, Simba allows him to live in the Pride Lands.

Ostriches
The following ostriches appear in The Lion Guard:

 Mbuni (voiced by Russi Taylor) is a cheerful ostrich who is the leader of her flock.
 Kambuni (voiced by Mckenna Grace) is a young ostrich chick.

Ullu
Ullu (voiced by Vyvan Pham) is an Indian scops owl who lives at the Tree of Life. She is the advisor of the Night Pride and reports anything going on near the Tree of Life.

Pinguino
Pinguino (voiced by Jamie Camil) is a macaroni penguin who lives at the Tree of Life and is the leader of his rookery.

Porcupines
The following porcupines appear in The Lion Guard:
 Porcupine Brothers are the duo of crested porcupines who lived in the Pride Lands.
 Smun (voiced by James Sie) is a Malayan porcupine who is the leader of his prickle and a servant of Mama Binturong.

Pride Lands' Birds
The following birds that reside in the Pride Lands in The Lion Guard:

 Tamaa (voiced by CJ Byrnes) is a fork-tailed drongo who can imitate the voice of any animal.
 Kulinda (voiced by Elise Allen) is a hamerkop who leaves her egg in Ono's nest while she builds a new nest that is safe from predators. She considers Ono to be part of her family, due to him taking good care of her baby. She later names her baby Ona, in honor of Ono.
 Nyuni (voiced by Nolan North) is a western yellow wagtail who temporarily becomes an unofficial member of Bupu's herd.

Red pandas
Kion and the Lion Guard encountered some red pandas in the mountains during their journey to the Tree of Life.

 Domog (voiced by Clyde Kusatsu) is the leader of his pack.
 Bogino (voiced by Fiona Riley) is a member of Domog's pack.
 Dughi (voiced by Matthew Yang King) is a member of Domog's pack.

Rhinoceroses
The following rhinos, whether they be either black or white rhinoceros, appear in The Lion Guard:

 Mbeya (voiced by Howy Parkins) is an old black rhinoceros who is the leader of his crash.
 Kifaru (voiced by Maurice LaMarche) is a white rhinoceros with poor eyesight. His name in Swahili means "Rhino". He has a red-billed oxpecker named Mwenzi (voiced by Rhys Darby) as his tickbird and friend. Kifaru is modeled after the late Sudan the last northern white rhinoceros who resides at Ol Pejeta Conservancy in Laikipia, Kenya.
 Young Rhino (voiced by Kari Wahlgren) is an unnamed young black rhinoceros calf.

Sable antelopes
The following sable antelopes appear in The Lion Guard:

 Bupu (voiced by Michael Dorn) is a stubborn sable antelope who is the leader of the herd and values polite behavior.
 Boboka (voiced by Erica Luttrell) is a sable antelope who is part of Bupu's herd.
 Mzaha (voiced by Cade Sutton) is a young fun-loving sable antelope who used to be part of Bupu's herd and is one of Chama's friends.

Sumu
Sumu (voiced by Ford Riley) is a venomous scorpion who was ordered by Scar to sting Simba.

Kiril
Kiril (voiced by Danny Jacobs) is a Siberian musk deer who lives at the Tree of Life and is the leader of his herd.

Tigers
Kion and the Lion Guard helped the Night Pride save some Tigers who are seeking the Tree of Life as their refuge:

 Varya (voiced by Iris Bahr) is the leader of her streak. She seeks sanctuary in the Tree of Life to safely raise her cubs. She and her cubs are chased by Makucha, Chuluun, and Ora when she and her cubs reached the pass, but are fortunately saved by the Lion Guard and the Night Pride. Rani then allows them to live in the Tree of Life.
  Feliks (voiced by Henry Kaufman) is the son of Varya.
 Pasha (voiced by Bluebelle Saraceno) is the daughter of Varya.
 Polina (voiced by Bluebelle Saraceno) is the daughter of Varya.

Skinks
The following skinks appear in The Lion Guard:

 Shupavu (voiced by Meghan Strange) is a sneaky skink who is the leader of the group. She dislikes being close to Pride Rock.
 Njano (voiced by Ford Riley) is a crafty, blue-tongued skink who is Shupavu's second-in-command.
 Nyeusi (voiced by Dee Bradley Baker) is a stealthy black skink who is a member of the group.
 Waza is an observant blue skink who is a member of the group.
 Nyata is a swift purple skink who is a member of the group.

Ushari
Ushari (voiced by Christian Slater) is an Egyptian cobra who often conflicted with Bunga and would get disturbed whenever the Lion Guard was near him. In The Rise of Scar, Ushari finally gets fed up with the Lion Guard disturbing his peace and inadvertently finds out that Kion talks to Mufasa's spirit. With this knowledge, he decides to join forces with Janja's clan and ends up helping them orchestrate the events that allow them to summon Scar's spirit so that he can guide them in defeating the Lion Guard. At the end of the season 3 opener Battle for the Pride Lands, Scar plots with Ushari to kill the Guard once and for all, as well as Janja, (after overhearing his hesitation on which sides to join). However, the plot fails, Janja betrays Scar, and a battle in the Outlands ensues. In a confrontation between Kion and Scar, Ushari attacks Kion and gives him a scar on his left eye, similar to his great uncle's. Despite this, Kion manages to defeat and destroy Scar once and for all by summoning the Great Kings of the Past, who vanquish Scar with rainwater. Ushari, in disbelief and anger, makes one last attempt on Kion's life, but is thwarted by Bunga, and falls to his death in the lava below.

Chuluun
Chuluun (voiced by Kimiko Glenn) is a cunning and sneaky, but arrogant female snow leopard. First encountered by the Lion Guard in the mountains in the episode "Ghost of the Mountain", Chuluun eventually is defeated for the first time as the Lion Guard fights back against her alongside a group of Red Pandas. After her defeat, however, she encounters Makucha and joins him to follow the Lion Guard to the Tree of Life. 

Snow monkeys
Kion and the Lion Guard encounter some snow monkeys in the mountains during their journey to the Tree of Life.

 Yuki (voiced by J. Elaine Marcos) is the leader of her snow monkey troop.
 Hitashi (voiced by Andrew Kishino) is married to Yuki and a member of her snow monkey troop.
 Kimyo (voiced by Ai-Chan Carrier) is the daughter of Yuki and Hitashi and a member of their troop.
 Nabasu (voiced by Evan Kishiyama) are the son of Yuki and Hitashi and a member of their troop.

Tenuk
Tenuk (voiced by Yuki Matsuzaki) is a Malayan tapir that the Lion Guard encounter in a forest during their journey to the Tree of Life.

Chura
Chura (voiced by Meghan Strange) is an African common toad.

Kongwe
Kongwe (voiced by CCH Pounder) is an African spurred tortoise who is the oldest and wisest animal in the Pride Lands.

Vultures
The following vultures appear in The Lion Guard:

 Mzingo (voiced by Greg Ellis) is a vulture who is Janja's majordomo of the Outlands. He is the leader of a flock of vultures that later is allied with Janja's clan and Jasiri's clan.
 Mwoga (voiced by Cam Clarke) is a foolish and clumsy vulture who is the spy of the parliament.

Zanzibar red colobuses
The following Zanzibar red colobuses appear in The Lion Guard:

 Tumbili (voiced by Ace Gibson) is the leader of his troop. His name in Swahili means "Monkey".
 Furaha (voiced by Mekai Curtis) is a young happy-go-lucky Zanzibar red colobus and former member of Tumbili's troop who is one of Chama's friends. His name in Swahili means "Happiness'".

Zebras
The following zebras appear in The Lion Guard:

 Thurston (voiced by Kevin Schon impersonating Jim Backus) is a dimwitted plains zebra who is the leader of his herd. He prides zebras as the animals who have the best sense of direction in the Pride Lands and most knowledgeable, while in reality, it's the opposite.
 Kwato (voiced by Lyons Luke Mathias) is a young plains zebra foal who is part of Thurston's herd.
 Muhimu (voiced by Kari Wahlgren, Emma Bunton in the UK version of "The Mbali Fields Migration") is a plains zebra who is the leader of her herd. She initially did not get along with Bunga after sitting on him by accident, but after Bunga saved her life, she comes to trust Bunga and deems him responsible enough to babysit her son.
  Hamu (voiced by Lyons Luke Mathias) is a young plains zebra foal who is Muhimu's son. Shortly after being born, he helped the Lion Guard fend off Janja, Cheezi, and Chungu.
 Dhahabu (voiced by Renée Elise Goldsberry) is a plains zebra with golden stripes who is the leader of her herd. Bunga admires her greatly. Dhahabu is modeled after the late Zoe the Golden Zebra who resided in Hawaii's Three Ring Ranch.
 Raha (voiced by Rico Rodriguez) is a plains zebra who is Starehe's brother and part of Dhahabu's herd.
 Starehe (voiced by Raini Rodriguez) is a plains zebra who is Raha's sister and part of Dhahabu's herd.

Introduced in The Lion King books

Kopa
Kopa is the son of Simba and Nala, appearing in the book series The Lion King: Six New Adventures, and is shown to look a lot like his father as a cub, except with a tuft of hair on top of his head. He debuts in the story A Tale of Two Brothers, which served as a prequel to The Lion King. The books were released before the film's production had finished, and thus, Alex Simmons (Kopa's creator) did not know that Simba and Nala would be given a cub at the end of the film.

Ahadi
Ahadi is the father of Mufasa and Taka (Scar), the grandfather of Simba, the great-grandfather of Kopa, and the king of the Pride Lands during the events of The Lion King: Six New Adventures story A Tale of Two Brothers. He is shown to look a lot like Mufasa except with darker fur but described as having green eyes and a black mane by the author of the book, making him more similar to Scar.

Uru
Uru is the mother of Mufasa and Taka (Scar), the grandmother of Simba, the great-grandmother of Kopa, and the queen of the Pride Lands during the events of The Lion King: Six New Adventures story A Tale of Two Brothers. She is absent from the book but is mentioned to have left to search for water to save the kingdom.

Mohatu
Mohatu (voiced by Avery Brooks on The Lion King: The Brightest Star audiotape) is the King of the Pride Lands during the events of the story The Brightest Star. He is the grandfather of Mufasa and Scar and the great-grandfather of Simba. He went to find water for the animals of the land during a drought and helped the animals get on with each other. When he died, he became a star that was brighter than the others. He is shown to look a lot like a darker furred version of Mufasa, having facial features like Simba's, and was said to have been one of the greatest kings of the Pride Lands. He is succeeded by Ahadi.

Ni
Ni is a character who appears in The Lion King: Six New Adventures story Nala's Dare. He is a young lion who has left his pride to start his own and travels through the Pride Lands during Scar's reign and saves Nala from hyenas before leaving, after meeting the rest of the Pridelanders.

Kula
Kula is a character in The Lion King: Six New Adventures story Nala's Dare. She is one of Nala's friends and one of the cubs of the Pridelanders who lived during Scar's reign.

Chumvi
Chumvi is a character in The Lion King: Six New Adventures story Nala's Dare. He is one of Nala's friends and one of the cubs of the Pridelanders.

Joka
Joka is a giant African rock python in The Lion King: Six New Adventures story A Snake in the Grass. He is extremely intelligent and can formulate complicated plans in a short amount of time. He has the power to twist his words into whatever he rightly wants and uses hypnotism to lure unsuspecting victims into believing his empty words. The name Joka translates as 'dragon' in the Swahili tongue.

Jelani
Jelani is Rafiki's lazy cousin in The Lion King: Six New Adventures story Follow the Leader. Despite being considered the leader of his troop, he is unconcerned about the suffering of his subjects, as he is often too concerned about his own welfare to lead them to a new home.

Kwaheri
Kwaheri is Kopa's monkey friend in The Lion King: Six New Adventures stories Nala's Dare and How True, Zazu? He is social, talkative, and critical to his friends. He often flaunts his talents around Kopa to either spark a reaction or just be a show-off.

Boma
Boma is a cape buffalo who appears in The Lion King: Six New Adventures stories A Tale of Two Brothers and How True, Zazu?. His grandparents were killed during an attack by ants. He is the leader of the cape buffalo and he is aggressive, controlling, selfish, strong, and short-tempered. He is also somewhat reclusive and gruff, as he doesn't seem to understand that there is a balance between species and refuses to share the last remaining water-hole during a drought, which can affect the whole of the Pride Lands. It is due to him that Taka got his scar after which he renamed himself Scar. If challenged or insulted he becomes very angry. However, he is mildly cooperative if not insulted or challenged. Taka tries to get Mufasa in trouble by telling him to talk with Boma to share the water-hole. Mufasa tries to reason with him to share the water-hole; however, he refuses. Scar then roars and tells him that he must obey or challenge Mufasa. He then chases after Mufasa who is rescued by Rafiki. Rafiki starts to grow tired while running but is picked up by Mufasa who then jumps across a ravine. Boma is unable to make the jumps and falls into it. Mufasa tells him that he doesn't have to fight but he keeps hurling threats while saying that the other buffaloes can still harm Taka. Taka is then attacked by three buffaloes during which he receives his scar. Ahadi stops this attack with a large herd of animals and has an elephant push Boma out of the ravine.

Zuzu
Zuzu is Ahadi's majordomo. She only appeared in A Tale of Two Brothers; although she was mentioned in How True, Zazu? It is revealed that she is Zazu's mother. Flirtatious and gossipy, Zuzu is a very maternal bird who never passes up the chance for some juicy gossip, much like her son, Zazu. Her talkative nature and nosy habits often make her a bit of an annoyance to the other animals; however, Ahadi puts her personality to good use to get a better grip on the doings of his kingdom. Zuzu is also known for being loyal and brave, as she was willing to help Rafiki even though she did not fully understand the danger Mufasa was in. It is revealed that she retired and gave Zazu her place as the king's majordomo.

King Joe
King Joe is a comic book character in The Lion King book A False Ancestor as he is a rogue stranger who lurks in the Pride Lands. He tricked Simba by saying that he was the great-great-great-grandfather of the current king, which is Mufasa. He later saves Simba from a river from nearly getting eaten by an alligator. After he saved Simba, he was never mentioned or seen again. He bears a similar mane and appearance to Nuka.

Introduced in the Hakuna Matata magazine
Kataka
Kataka is a meerkat who appears in the story called Falling in Love. She is part of a meerkat colony that lives in the same oasis that Timon and Pumbaa reside in.

Zak
Zak is a zebra who appears in a story called Falling in Love. He resides in the same oasis as Timon and Pumbaa. Timon enlisted Zak to help get Kataka back to her colony.

Growler
Growler is a young warthog who appears in a story called Pumbaa's New Friends''. He is part of the warthog sounder that lives in the same oasis as Timon and Pumbaa. He considered Pumbaa a disgrace to all warthogs when his mother befriended Pumbaa. After Simba and Timon expose Growler's plot to dispose of Pumbaa, Growler's mother called Growler a disgrace and banished him from her sounder.

References

 
Lists of Disney animated film characters
Lists of fictional animals by work
Lists of fictional animals in animation